Geir André Herrem (born 28 January 1988) is a Norwegian former footballer .

Club career

FC Flora Tallinn
In July 2011, after impressing in a mid-season friendly tournament, he signed a contract until the end of the 2011 season with Estonian champions FC Flora Tallinn. On 3 August he got off the mark for the team as he scored a hat-trick in a round of 64 Estonian Cup match against lower league amateurs FC Lelle. He finished the league season with 9 appearances and 1 goal.

He went on trial at English club Port Vale in February 2013.

Herrem joined FK Vidar after his stint at Port Vale F.C. and became a popular player for the Vidar fans. He left to join Fyllingsdalen in August 2014.

Career statistics

Club

Honours
Flora Tallinn
Meistriliiga: 2011

References

External links
 
 

1988 births
Living people
People from Bryne
Sportspeople from Rogaland
Norwegian footballers
Ålgård FK players
Bryne FK players
SV Babelsberg 03 players
FC Flora players
FK Vidar players
Åsane Fotball players
FK Bodø/Glimt players
Kalmar FF players
Norwegian First Division players
3. Liga players
Eliteserien players
Allsvenskan players
Norwegian expatriate footballers
Expatriate footballers in Germany
Norwegian expatriate sportspeople in Germany
Expatriate footballers in Estonia
Norwegian expatriate sportspeople in Estonia
Expatriate footballers in Sweden
Norwegian expatriate sportspeople in Sweden
Association football forwards
Meistriliiga players